Winters is a surname, and may refer to the following people:

People

Men 

 L. Alan Winters (born 1950), British development economist
 Alex Winters (born 1977), Welsh children's television presenter and actor
 Ben H. Winters (born 1976), American author, journalist, teacher and playwright
 Bernie Winters (1930–1991), English comedian
 Bill Winters (born 1961), American banker
 Bob Winters (fl. 1940s–1970s), American comic juggler and occasional actor
 Brendan Winters (born 1983), American basketball player
 Brian Winters (born 1952), American basketball player and coach
 Charles Winters (1913–1984), American who smuggled B-17 bombers to Israel in 1948
 Chet Winters (born 1960), running back in the National Football League
 Chuck Winters (born 1974), Canadian footballer
 Clarence Winters (1899–1945), American baseball pitcher
 Dan Winters (born 1962), American portrait photographer, illustrator, filmmaker, and writer
 David Winters (disambiguation), several people
 Dean Winters (born 1964), American television actor
 Eddie Winters (fl. 2010s), American police officer and politician
 Frank Winters (ice hockey), known as Frank "Coddy" Winters (1884–1944), American ice hockey player
 Frank Winters (born 1964), American NFL football player
 Fred Winters (born 1982), Canadian male volleyball player
 Frederick Winters, American weightlifter and Olympic medalist
 Ian Winters (1921–1994), Scottish footballer
 Jeffrey A. Winters, American political scientist
 Jesse Winters (1893–1986), American baseball player
 John D. Winters (1916–1997), American historian
 John Winters (footballer) (born 1960), English footballer
 Jonathan Winters (1925–2013), American comedic actor
 Joseph Winters (1824–1916), African-American abolitionist and inventor
 Kenneth W. Winters (born 1934), Kentucky legislator
 Larry Winters (1956–2015), American professional wrestler and trainer
 Lawrence Winters (1915–1965), American opera singer
 Leo Winters (1922–2005), Oklahoma politician
 Mark Winters (born 1971), boxer from Northern Ireland
 Matt Winters (born 1960), baseball player from Buffalo, New York
 Michael Sean Winters, American journalist and writer
 Michael Winters (disambiguation), several people
 Mike and Bernie Winters (Mike born 1930, Bernie 1932–1991), double-act of British comedians
 Nathan Winters (born 1978), American politician from Wyoming
 Nip Winters (1899–1971), pitcher in Negro league baseball
 Patrick Winters (1904–1994), Irish-born Pallottine priest
 Paul Winters (American football) (born 1958), American college football coach
 Paul Winters (hurler) (born 1994), Irish hurler
 Philip C. Winters (born 1937), Republican politician
 Ralph E. Winters (1909–2004), Canadian-born film editor
 Richard Winters (1918–2011), officer with the 506th Parachute Infantry Regiment during World War II
 Robbie Winters (born 1974), Scottish footballer
 Robert Winters (1910–1969), Canadian politician
 Robin Winters (born 1950), American conceptual artist and teacher
 Roland Winters (1904–1989), American actor
 Roy Winters (born 1975), English rugby union player
 Scott William Winters (born 1965), American actor
Theodore H. Winters Jr. (1913–2008), American Navy flying ace during World War II
 Yvor Winters (1900–1968), American literary critic and poet

Women 
 Amy Winters (born 1978), Australian Paralympic athlete
 Anne Winters (actress) (born 1994), American actress
 Anne Winters (poet), leftist American poet
 Charlotte Winters (1897–2007), last surviving female American veteran of The First World War
 Deborah Winters (born 1953), American actress and realtor
 Gloria Winters (1931–2010), American television actress
 Ivy Winters (born 1986), American drag performer, singer, and actor
 Jackie Winters (1937–2019), American politician
 Jane Winters (born 1970), British professor of digital humanities
 Joan Winters (1909–1933), American Broadway dancer
 Kari-Lynn Winters (born 1969), Canadian children's author and literacy researcher
 Kathleen Winters (1949–2010), American author and aviator
 Keelin Winters (born 1988), American footballer and daughter of Brian Winters
 Lisa Winters (born 1937), American model and December 1956 Playmate of the Month
 Marian Winters (1920–1978), American dramatist and actress
 Michelle Winters, Canadian writer and artist
 Mickey Winters (born 1940), American model and September 1962 Playmate of the Month
 Pepper Winters, American novelist born in Hong Kong
 Rebecca Winters, pseudonym of Rebecca Burton (born 1940), American novelist
Ruby Winters (1942–2016), American soul singer
 Shelley Winters (1920–2006), American actress
Topaz Winters (born 1999), Singaporean writer

Fictional characters 
 Cher Winters, from the British Channel 4 soap opera Hollyoaks
 David Winters, portrayed by Paul Petersen in the 1958 film Houseboat
 David Winters, portrayed by Christopher Plummer in the 2008 film Emotional Arithmetic
 Delores Winters, a DC Comics character
 Drucilla Winters, from the American CBS soap opera The Young and the Restless
 Ethan Winters, from Capcom's survival horror game Resident Evil 7 & Resident Evil 8
 Malcolm Winters, from the American CBS soap opera The Young and the Restless
 Neil Winters, from the American CBS soap opera The Young and the Restless
 Norah Winters, from Marvel Comics
 Olivia Winters, from the CBS Daytime soap opera, The Young and the Restless
 Talia Winters, on the science fiction television show Babylon 5
 Victoria Winters, in the cult classic series Dark Shadows
 Arthur Coleman Winters, portrayed by Colin Stinton from the British Series, "Doctor Who"

See also 
 Vinters
 Winter (surname)
 Winterson
 De Winter (surname)
 Winters (disambiguation)